The 2011 Armor All Gold Coast 600 was a motor race for the Australian sedan-based V8 Supercars racing cars. It was the eleventh event of the 2011 International V8 Supercars Championship. It was held on the weekend of 21 to 23 October at the Surfers Paradise Street Circuit in Surfers Paradise, Queensland. It was the tenth V8 Supercar championship event held at the circuit, the second running of the Gold Coast 600, and the eighteenth annual overall Australian Touring Car event at the circuit (including seven non-championship ATCC/V8 Supercar rounds and two non-championship Super Touring rounds), and the twenty-first race meet overall at the street circuit, dating back to the 1991 CART race.

The event hosted races 21 and 22 of the 2011 season. As in 2010, a single 102 lap, 300-kilometre race was held on Saturday and Sunday. Qualifying for Race 21 consisted of a 20-minute, all-in session with the fastest ten progressing to the top ten shootout. Qualifying for Race 22 was a single 20 minute, all-in session. Each team was required to employ a driver with an 'international reputation' for the event, with one driver needing to complete a minimum of 34 laps in each race.

Many international drivers came from the IndyCar Series, Formula One and Sports Car racing. A restriction was put in place preventing international drivers who competed in the L&H 500 and the Bathurst 1000 from taking part. However, in light of the Las Vegas crash that killed Holden Racing Team international driver Dan Wheldon a week prior to the event, this restriction was lifted to accommodate drivers who could not participate due to the accident, as Will Power (Ford Performance Racing, injured in the Lap 11 crash) and Tony Kanaan (Brad Jones Racing, was leading when race abandoned) also withdrew. Darren Turner (Wheldon), Richard Lyons (Power), and Allan Simonsen (Kanaan) were named replacements.  The International Drivers Trophy was renamed in Wheldon's honor. The winner of this was French Indycar and Sportscar driver Sébastien Bourdais.

As with Bathurst, Fox Sports brought commentators Mike Joy (Statesville, North Carolina) and Darrell Waltrip (Franklin, Tennessee to Surfers Paradise for live coverage overseas.

Entry List

Results

Race 21

Race 22

Dan Wheldon Trophy Points

Standings
 After 22 of 28 races.

References

External links
Official website
Official timing and results
Official series website

Armor All Gold Coast 600
Sport on the Gold Coast, Queensland